Elizabeth Tait may refer to:

Elizabeth Tait, appeared in the 1906 film The Story of the Kelly Gang
Elizabeth Tait (Holby City)

See also
Elizabeth Tate (disambiguation)